The 2004–05 season was the 82nd season in the existence of Elche CF and the club's sixth consecutive season in the second division of Spanish football. In addition to the domestic league, Elche participated in this season's edition of the Copa del Rey. The season covered the period from 1 July 2004 to 30 June 2005.

Competitions

Overview

Segunda División

League table

Results summary

Results by round

Matches

Copa del Rey

Statistics

Squad statistics

|-
! colspan=14 style=background:#dcdcdc; text-align:center|Goalkeepers

|-
! colspan=14 style=background:#dcdcdc; text-align:center|Defenders

|-
! colspan=14 style=background:#dcdcdc; text-align:center|Midfielders

|-
! colspan=14 style=background:#dcdcdc; text-align:center|Forwards

|-
! colspan=14 style=background:#dcdcdc; text-align:center| Players who have made an appearance or had a squad number this season but have left the club
|}

Goalscorers

References

Elche CF seasons
Elche